The , formerly known as the , is Japanese aerial lift line in Izunokuni, Shizuoka. Opened in 1992, the line climbs Mount Katsuragi with the view of Mount Fuji.

Basic data
Cable length: 
Vertical interval:

See also
List of aerial lifts in Japan

External links
 Katsuragiyama-Panoramapark official website

Gondola lifts in Japan
Tourist attractions in Shizuoka Prefecture
Transport in Shizuoka Prefecture
1992 establishments in Japan
Izunokuni